Viitorul București (English: "Viitorul" = Future) was a Romanian football club from the capital of Romania, Bucharest.

History
Viitorul București was founded in the summer of 1962 and consisted of the Romanian national youth team, who had previously won the UEFA youth tournament in their own country.

Originally, Gheorghe Ola assembled and trained the team who got a place in the highest Romanian League, the Divizia A, which was raised for this purpose on 15 teams without qualification. At the beginning of 1963 Viitorul was ruled out and dissolved in the championship. The players were mostly taken over by other Bucharest teams or returned to their home clubs.

They played in 1962–63 Divizia A, and it was dissolved in mid-season.

Bibliography

References

External links
 http://www.worldfootball.net/teams/viitorul-bucuresti/1963/3/
 http://www.labtof.ro/echipa/romania/viitorul-bucuresti-222/1962-1963/
 http://www.steauafc.com/en/antrenori/19/

1962 establishments in Romania
1963 disestablishments in Romania
Association football clubs disestablished in 1963
Association football clubs established in 1962
Football clubs in Bucharest